Michael Carter (died November 1954) was an Irish politician and farmer. He was first elected to Dáil Éireann at the June 1927 general election as a Farmers' Party Teachta Dála (TD) for the Leitrim–Sligo constituency. He lost his seat at the September 1927 general election. He stood as an independent candidate at the 1932 general election but was not elected.

Carter was an auctioneer and valuer and was also involved in the Ancient Order of Hibernians, once holding the position of Leitrim county president.

He was elected to Leitrim County Council in 1911, and from 1926 to 1934, he was chairman of the council.

He died at Ruskey, Carrick-on-Shannon, County Leitrim, in November 1954, at "over 80 years of age".

References

Year of birth missing
1954 deaths
Farmers' Party (Ireland) TDs
Members of the 5th Dáil
Irish farmers
Local councillors in County Leitrim